The 2002 NCAA Division I Men's Basketball Championship Game was the finals of the 2002 NCAA Division I men's basketball tournament and it determined the national champion for the 2001-02 NCAA Division I men's basketball season  The 2002 National Title Game was played on April 1, 2002 at the Georgia Dome in Atlanta, Georgia, The 2002 National Title Game was played between the 2002 East Regional Champions, #1-seeded Maryland and the 2002 South Regional Champions, #5-seeded Indiana.

Starting lineups

Game summary
The Maryland Terrapins completed the task they set out to do one year earlier by defeating the Indiana Hoosiers, 64–52. Maryland led virtually the entire game except for a brief point with 9:50 left in the basketball game when Indiana took a 44–42 lead. Maryland answered the Hoosier run and ended the game with a 22–8 run to bring home the school's first and coach Gary Williams' only men's basketball National Championship.  Senior Juan Dixon was named the tournament's Most Outstanding Player (MOP).

Aftermath
On November 19, 2012, Maryland would join the Big Ten Conference becoming the 13th member to join the conference. Since Indiana was already in the Big Ten Conference, the two teams would later become conference foes and end up facing each other at least once every year.

References

NCAA Division I Men's Basketball Championship Game
NCAA Division I Men's Basketball Championship Games
Indiana Hoosiers men's basketball
Maryland Terrapins men's basketball
College basketball tournaments in Georgia (U.S. state)
Basketball competitions in Atlanta
NCAA Division I Men's Basketball Championship Game
NCAA Division I Men's Basketball Championship Game
NCAA Division I Men's Basketball Championship Game